is the debut studio album from Yuki Saito, released on June 21, 1985, by Canyon Records. It reached #6 on the Oricon charts, and has been repackaged and rereleased twice. It contains six original songs and four which had previously been released as singles.

History
Axia was released on LP and cassette on June 21, 1985, by Canyon Records. The album was released two weeks later on CD on July 5, 1985. The album collects four songs released previously as singles as well as six additional songs. It reached #3 on the Oricon charts and sold 287,000 copies.

"Sotsugyō" was composed by Kyōhei Tsutsumi, arranged by Satoshi Takebe, with lyrics by Takashi Matsumoto.

The B-side, was composed by Tsutsumi, arranged by Masataka Matsutoya, with lyrics by Matsumoto. "Seishun" was used in commercials for the home video release of the Fuji TV 1985 drama series  in which Saito starred.

"Shiroi Honō" had lyrics by Yukinojō Mori, with the music composed by Kōji Tamaki and arranged by Takebe. "Shabon-iro no Natsu" also has lyrics by Mori, and was composed by Toshio Kamei and arranged by Takebe. It was used as the theme song for the first Sukeban Deka television drama series, in which Saito also starred as the main character, Saki.

 was used in commercials for the Axia brand of cassette tapes from Fujifilm in Japan. Natsuo Giniro composed the song and wrote the lyrics, and Takebe arranged the music.

Axia has been rereleased twice since the original release in 1985. It was released as a "Gold CD" on March 21, 1989 (catalog #D35A-0476), and in a special paper jacket packaging and remastered high quality (or "HQ") CD on August 5, 2009 (catalog #PCCA-50132).

Chart history

Track listing

LP (catalog #C28A0416, released June 21, 1985)
Cassette (catalog #28P6438, released June 21, 1985)

CD (catalog #D32A-0096, released July 5, 1985)
Gold CD (catalog #D35A-0476, released March 21, 1989)
HQ CD (catalog #PCCA-50132, released August 5, 2009)

Notes

References

1985 debut albums
Pony Canyon albums
Yuki Saito (actress) albums